The 2017 Supersport 300 World Championship was the first season of the Supersport 300 World Championship. The debut season was contested over nine races, which were held at all the European rounds of 2017 Superbike World Championship, starting from 2 April at MotorLand Aragón in Spain to 22 October at Circuito de Jerez in Spain.

Race calendar and results

Entry list

All entries used Pirelli tyres.

Championship standings

Riders' championship

Bold – Pole positionItalics – Fastest lap

Manufacturers' championship

References

Supersport 300 World Championship
Supersport 300 World Championship seasons